Ridgewood may refer to:

Geography

Australia
Ridgewood, Western Australia

Canada
Ridgewood, Ontario
Ridgewood, Edmonton, Alberta

United Kingdom
Ridgewood, East Sussex

United States
Ridgewood Heights, California
Ridgewood, Illinois
Ridgewood, New Jersey
Ridgewood, Queens, New York, a neighborhood in New York City
Ridgewood, Niagara County, New York
Ridgewood, Ohio

New Zealand
Ridgewood, Taranaki, a suburb of New Plymouth in North Island, New Zealand

Transportation
Ridgewood (NJT station), the train station in Ridgewood, New Jersey; listed on the NRHP
Ridgewood (LIRR Lower Montauk station), a closed station on the Lower Montauk line of the Long Island Rail Road (LIRR)
Ridgewood, the original name for Wantagh (LIRR station)
Ridgewood, the replacement name given to the former DeKalb Avenue station on the LIRR Evergreen Branch
Ridgewood, the name of a LIRR station in Ridgewood, Queens
Ridgewood, the previous name for Cypress Avenue/Dummy Crossing station on the LIRR Manhattan Beach/Bay Ridge Branch

Other
Ridgewood Park (baseball ground), a former baseball ground
Ridgewood Preparatory School, a college preparatory school in New Orleans, Louisiana
Ridgewood School, an academy in Scawsby, Doncaster, England

See also
Ridgewood High School (disambiguation)